The Basketball competitions in the 1977 Summer Universiade were held in Sofia, Bulgaria. The United States beat the Soviet Union in the final in the men's tournament, but was beaten in the women's competition.

Format 

In the men's tournament, 31 participants were divided into 7 groups of four teams and one group of three. They played a single round-robin match and the winners advanced to the second round and the others to the classification round. In the second round, two groups of four teams played round-robin matches and the top two teams of each group advanced to the semi-final. In the classification round, five groups of four teams and one group of three played round-robin matches and then advanced to the placement sem-finals and finals.

Men's competition

First round 

 Group A

 Group B

 Group C

 Group D

 Group E

Second round 

 Group A (1st - 8th)

 Group B (9th - 16th)

 Group C (17th - 24th)

 Group D (25th - 31st)

 Group 1 (1st - 8th) 

 Group 2 (9th - 16th)

 Group 3 (17th - 24th)

 Group 1 (1st - 8th)

  Group 2 (9th - 16th)

 Group 3 (17th - 24th)

Group 1 (1st - 8th) 

 Group 2 (9th - 16th)

 Group 3 (17th - 24th)

Classification round

Semi-finals

Group A 
 1st - 4th

 5th - 8th

Group B 
 9th - 12th

 13th - 16th

Group C 
 17th - 20th

 21st - 24th

Group D 
 25th - 28th

 29th -

Finals 

 Gold medal match

 Third-place match

 Fifth-place match

 7th place match

 9th place match

 11th place match

 13th place match

 15th place match

 17th place match

 19th place match

 21st place match

 23rd place match

 25th place match

 27th place match

Final standings

Women's competition

Preliminary round 

 Group A

 Group B

 Group C

 Group D

Second round 

 semifinals

Semifinals

Group A 

 1st - 4th

 5th - 8th

Group B 

 9th - 12th

 13th - 16th

Finals 

 Gold medal match

 Bronze medal match

 5th place match

 7th place match

 9th place match

 11th place match

 13th place match

 15th place match

Final standings

References 

 New York Times (Scores for the final and 3rd place matches)
 Men's results (todor66.com)
 Women's results (todor66.com)
 Men's results (sports123.com)
 Women's results (sports123.com)

Basketball
1977 in basketball
1977
International basketball competitions hosted by Bulgaria